Elisa Heinsohn (born October 11, 1962) is an actress who starred as Jillian Beckett in the sixth season of the television series version of Fame. She was Meg Giry in the original Broadway cast of The Phantom of the Opera in 1988.

In 1993 series Dark Justice, Heinsohn played the lead role Samantha "Sam" Collins, replacing Carrie-Anne Moss, who portrayed Judge Nick Marshall's (Bruce Abbott) previous clerk, Tara.

External links
 

American musical theatre actresses
1962 births
Living people
American television actresses
20th-century American actresses
21st-century American women